Kevin Alexander Kabran (born 22 November 1993) is a Swedish footballer who currently plays as a left winger for Eliteserien club Viking FK.

Career
Kabran played for Vasalund between 2012 and 2014, before joining the Netherlands club Den Bosch ahead of the 2014–15 season. After an unsuccessful stay in the Netherlands he moved back to Vasalund. After impressing in Vasalund, Kabran signed for Brommapojkarna ahead of the 2017 season. After one season in the club, he moved to Norwegian side IK Start. He then made his Eliteserien debut on 11 March 2018 against Tromsø.

On 22 January 2021, Kabran signed a three-year contract with Viking FK.

Career statistics

Club

Notes

References

External links 
 
 

1993 births
Living people
Swedish footballers
Swedish expatriate footballers
Association football forwards
Vasalunds IF players
FC Den Bosch players
IF Brommapojkarna players
IK Start players
Viking FK players
Ettan Fotboll players
Eerste Divisie players
Superettan players
Eliteserien players
Norwegian First Division players
Allsvenskan players
Swedish expatriate sportspeople in the Netherlands
Swedish expatriate sportspeople in Norway
Expatriate footballers in the Netherlands
Expatriate footballers in Norway
Footballers from Stockholm